A list of New Zealand art awards and residencies.

Current awards

Residencies

Past awards

References